Rosenberger Building is a historic commercial building located at Colfax, Clinton County, Indiana.  It was built about 1850, and is a two-story, three bay, rectangular brick building.  It measures 20 feet wide and 41 feet deep, and has a 16 feet by 24 feet frame rear addition.  It features round arch window openings.  It is the oldest commercial building in Colfax.

It was listed on the National Register of Historic Places in 1984.

References

Commercial buildings on the National Register of Historic Places in Indiana
Commercial buildings completed in 1850
Buildings and structures in Clinton County, Indiana
National Register of Historic Places in Clinton County, Indiana